The 1994–95 SM-liiga season was the 20th season of the SM-liiga, the top level of ice hockey in Finland. 12 teams participated in the league, and TPS Turku won the championship.

Standings

Playoffs

Quarterfinals
 Jokerit - KalPa 3:0 (6:3, 6:0, 5:1)
 Lukko - Kiekko-Espoo 3:1 (4:3 P, 2:4, 2:1 P, 4:3)
 HIFK - Ässät 0:3 (1:2, 0:3, 0:3)
 TPS - JYP 3:1 (2:1 P, 2:4, 4:3 P, 8:0)

Semifinals
 Jokerit - Ässät 3:0 (6:0, 4:3, 7:0)
 Lukko - TPS 1:3 (6:4, 3:4, 4:6, 3:4)

3rd place
 Ässät - Lukko 3:0

Final
 Jokerit - TPS 2:3 (2:1, 1:3, 5:2, 2:5, 1:5)

External links
 SM-liiga official website

Fin
1994-95
1